Winning Ways for Your Mathematical Plays (Academic Press, 1982) by Elwyn R. Berlekamp, John H. Conway, and Richard K. Guy is a compendium of information on mathematical games.  It was first published in 1982 in two volumes.

The first volume introduces combinatorial game theory and its foundation in the surreal numbers; partizan and impartial games; Sprague–Grundy theory and misère games. The second volume applies the theorems of the first volume to many games, including nim, sprouts, dots and boxes, Sylver coinage, philosopher's phutball, fox and geese. A final section on puzzles analyzes the Soma cube, Rubik's Cube, peg solitaire, and Conway's Game of Life.

A republication of the work by A K Peters split the content into four volumes.

Editions
1st edition, New York: Academic Press, 2 vols., 1982; vol. 1, hardback: , paperback: ; vol. 2, hardback: , paperback: .
2nd edition, Wellesley, Massachusetts: A. K. Peters Ltd., 4 vols., 2001–2004; vol. 1: ; vol. 2: ; vol. 3: ; vol. 4: .

Games mentioned in the book

This is a partial list of the games mentioned in the book.

Note: Misere games not included

Hackenbush
Blue-Red Hackenbush
Blue-Red-Green Hackenbush (Introduced as Hackenbush Hotchpotch in the book)
Childish Hackenbush
Ski-Jumps
Toads-and-Frogs
Cutcake
Maundy Cake
(2nd Unnamed Cutcake variant by Dean Hickerson)
Hotcake
Coolcakes
Baked Alaska
Eatcake
Turn-and-Eatcake
Col
Snort
Nim (Green Hackenbush)
Prim
Dim
Lasker's Nim
Seating Couples
Northcott's Game (Poker-Nim)
The White Knight
Wyt Queens (Wythoff's Game)
Kayles
Double Kayles
Quadruple Kayles
Dawson's Chess
Dawson's Kayles
Treblecross
Grundy's Game
Mrs. Grundy
 Domineering
 No Highway
 De Bono's L-Game
 Snakes-and-Ladders (Adders-and-Ladders)
 Jelly Bean Game
 Dividing Rulers

Reviews
Games

See also
On Numbers and Games by John H. Conway, one of the three coauthors of Winning Ways

References

1982 non-fiction books
Books about game theory
Combinatorial game theory
John Horton Conway